Blasieholmen Church was a Lutheran church at Blasieholmen in Stockholm built in 1867 and inaugurated with a church service on 12 January 1868. It was demolished in 1964. It was built on initiative from the priest Gustaf Emanuel Beskow.

References

Churches in Stockholm
Churches completed in 1868
1868 establishments in Sweden